= Washington Barcala =

- Born: Washington Barcala; July 3, 1920; Montevideo, Uruguay
- Died: December 8, 1993 (aged 73); Montevideo, Uruguay
- Education: Círculo de Bellas Artes, Montevideo; Academia de San Fernando, Madrid
- Known for: Painting; use of varied and austere materials under geometric ordering

Washington Barcala (1920–1993) was a Uruguayan painter and mixed-media artist. He is associated with mid-20th-century Uruguayan modernism and spent significant periods working both in Uruguay and Spain.
